Audifia is a genus of comb-footed spiders that was first described by Eugen von Keyserling in 1884.  it contains three species, found in Africa and Brazil: A. duodecimpunctata, A. laevithorax, and A. semigranosa.

See also
 List of Theridiidae species

References

Araneomorphae genera
Spiders of Africa
Spiders of Brazil
Taxa named by Eugen von Keyserling
Theridiidae